Yevloyev or Evloev is an Ingush surname. People with the surname include:

Movsar Evloev (born 1994), Russian mixed martial artist
Musa Evloev (born 1993), Russian Greco-Roman wrestler
Muslim Evloev (1995-2020), Russian-Kyrgyz freestyle wrestler
Magomed Yevloyev (1971-2008), Russian-Ingush journalist
Zurab Yevloyev (born 1980), Russian footballer